James Goodwin was an escaped convict.

James Goodwin may also refer to:
 James Goodwin, author/editor of the book International Art Markets
D. James Goodwin, American record producer
James Godwyn (1557–1616), or Goodwin, English politician
Jim Goodwin (born 1981), Irish footballer
Jim Goodwin (baseball) (1926–2008), American pitcher in Major League Baseball
Sir James Goodwin, a major character in the novella series Belinda Blinked

See also
James Godwin, Navy admiral